Beetlewing, or beetlewing art, is an ancient craft technique using iridescent beetle wings practiced traditionally in Thailand, Myanmar, India, China and Japan. Notable beetlewing garments include Lady Curzon's peacock dress (1903) and a costume dress worn by the actress Ellen Terry as Lady Macbeth, depicted in the painting Ellen Terry as Lady Macbeth (1889).

Tradition
It was common in some of the ancient cultures of Asia to attach beetlewing pieces as an adornment to paintings, textiles and jewelry. Different species of metallic wood-boring beetle wings were used depending on the region, but traditionally the most valued were those from beetles belonging to genus Sternocera. Their wings were valued for their beautiful and hardy metallic emerald iridescence. The shiny appearance of beetlewings is long-lasting. They are surprisingly durable if subject to normal non-abusive use. 

In Thailand, beetlewings of wood–boring beetles Sternocera spp., like Sternocera aequisignata, were preferred to decorate clothing (shawls and Sabai cloth) and jewelry in former court circles. The beetles have a short life span of 3 to 4 weeks in their adult stage. To avoid killing the beetles, only those that die of natural causes are collected. 

In 19th-century India exquisite masterpieces of embroidered textiles were produced using beetlewing pieces. These cloth items have survived the passage of time without losing their splendor.

In some instances, the beetle wings will retain their natural sparkle, even though the cloth surrounding them may have decayed.

The species of beetle traditionally used in decorative work in Japan is Chrysochroa fulgidissima, known also as Tamamushi.

Survival
In Thailand this ancient tradition has mostly died out. In Bangkok, rare pieces of crafts and jewelry made with beetlewing are displayed at the Dusit Palace complex of King Chulalongkorn (Rama V), now a museum. 

Thanks to the encouragement and support of Queen Sirikit, efforts are being made to preserve this traditional art at the Chitralada Center by supporting artisans who have kept the skill alive. 
Modern beetlewing work is usually applied on simple items, like earrings and collage work. These are marketed mostly through tourist-oriented shops.

See also
Buprestidae (Jewel beetles)
Beadwork
Tamamushi

References

External links

Thai Handicrafts – Beetle-Wing Decorations
Beetle–Wing Decoration–Collage  
แมลงทับ 
แมลงทับ – Sternocera varieties 
Chitralada Palace artisans – The Queen's craftsmen
 Hampshire Museum –  A Beetle-Wing Tea-Cosy from Myanmar
Stitches to attach beetle wing

Thai culture
Indian art
Burmese culture
Handicrafts
Jewellery
Woven fabrics
Insects in culture
Insects in art
Insects in religion
Beetles and humans